These are the results of the men's 70 kg competition in weightlifting at the 1996 Summer Olympics in Atlanta.  A total of 28 athletes entered this event.

Results
Each weightlifter had three attempts for both the snatch and clean and jerk lifting methods.  The total of the best successful lift of each method was used to determine the final rankings and medal winners.

See also
1998 World Weightlifting Championships - Men's 69 kg

References

Sources
 

069